William Sousa "Soo" or "Sou" Bridgeforth Jr. (March 23, 1907 – July 26, 2004), was the owner of several Negro leagues baseball teams as well as the New Era Club in Nashville.

Early life
William Bridgeforth Jr. was born in Tanner, Alabama in 1907, the grandson of former slaves. He went to high school at Trinity High School in Athens where he played baseball. After his parents deaths when he was 18, he moved to Nashville working as a bricklayer with his uncle Nick Stuart.

Career
In 1932, Bridgeforth used the proceeds of the sale of his parents' farm to purchase a pool hall in downtown Nashville. He went on to open two more pool halls before opening the New Era Club in downtown Nashville in 1939. In the 1940s, Bridgeforth raised enough money to purchase the Baltimore Elite Giants, a Negro league baseball team. As time went on, he would also own for some time the Negro league teams the Nashville Stars and the Birmingham Black Barons.

References

Negro league baseball executives
1907 births
2004 deaths